The 2006-07 Segona Divisió was the eighth season of the Segona Divisió, the second tier of football in Andorra.  The season began on 23 September 2006 and finished on 20 May 2007.  Casa Estrella Del Benfica won the division and were promoted to the 2007–08 Primera Divisió.  UE Engordany won a promotion/relegation playoff against FC Encamp and were also promoted to the 2007–08 Primera Divisió.

League format 

The league consisted of eight teams playing each other twice.  After fourteen games the top four clubs retained their record and entered a play off.  The play off consisted on each side playing each other twice.  The top team became champions and won promotion to the 2007–08 Primera Divisió.  The next highest placed team entered a playoff against the seventh placed team in the 2006–07 Primera Divisió.  B teams were ineligible for promotion.

Teams 

The following eight clubs comprised the Segona Divisió in 2006-07:

League table

Each team played each other twice with the top four qualifying for the playoff.

Playoff 

Casa Estrella del Benfica were crowned champions and promoted to the following season's Primera Divisió.  The next highest placed team entered a playoff against the seventh placed team in the 2006–07 Primera Divisió.  B teams were ineligible for promotion.  This meant that third placed UE Engordany took part in the playoff instead of second placed Santa Coloma B.

Promotion/relegation playoff 

UE Engordany won and were promoted to the next season's Primera Divisió.

Segona Divisió seasons
Andorra
2006–07 in Andorran football